George Elliston (1883 - October 7, 1946) was an American journalist.

Biography
George Elliston was born in  Mount Sterling, Kentucky. She graduated from Covington High School.

Elliston worked as a reporter for the Cincinnati Times-Star and later as the Society Editor for that newspaper.

She married Augustus Coleman in 1907 and lived briefly with him in St. Louis. She and Coleman separated, and Elliston lived simply and alone in Cincinnati for the remainder of her life.

Upon her death in Madisonville, Cincinnati, Ohio, on October 7, 1946, Elliston bequeathed  to the University of Cincinnati to establish a chair "to promote the cause of poetry". The university inaugurated the Elliston Poet-in-Residence Program in 1951. Composer Margaret McClure Stitt set many of Elliston's poems to music.

Notable Elliston poets

 John Ashbery
 Wendell Berry
 John Berryman
 Lynn Emanuel
 Robert Frost
 Alice Fulton
 Louise Glück
 Albert Goldbarth
 Marilyn Hacker
 Donald Hall
 Michael Harper
 Jane Hirshfield
 John Hollander
 Richard Howard
 Randall Jarrell
 Donald Justice
 Carolyn Kizer
 David Lehman
 Denise Levertov
 Philip Levine
 Robert Lowell
 Heather McHugh
 Marilyn Nelson
 Mary Oliver
 Molly Peacock
 David St. John
 Louis Simpson
 Gary Soto
 Gary Snyder
 Stephen Spender
 William Stafford
 Ellen Bryant Voigt
 David Wagoner
 C.D. Wright
 Jay Wright

References

1883 births
1946 deaths
American women journalists
People from Mount Sterling, Kentucky
Women's page journalists